Potamogeton natans, commonly known as broad-leaved pondweed, floating pondweed, or floating-leaf pondweed, is an aquatic species in the genus Potamogeton native to quiet or slow-flowing freshwater habitats throughout the Holarctic Kingdom.

Description

It produces both floating and submersed leaves on the same plant. The floating leaves are ovate to oblong-ovate and almost always cordate at the base.  They are dark green, leathery, opaque, with translucent longitudinal veins.  They are 5 to 10 cm long, pointed at the tips, and rounded at the base.

The stipules are 4 to 17 cm long.

The submerged grass-like structures are called phyllodes, are actually modified leaf stalks.

The stems are cylindrical, without many branches, and grow from 1 to 2 metres.

The main difference between this species and other pondweeds is a discoloured flexible joint just below the top of the long leaf stalk.

The flower spikes are dense, and cylindrical.  They are 5 to 10 cm long, pointed at the tip and rounded at the base.  It flowers from May to September.

The fruits are 4 to 5 mm long and obovate.

References

External links

 Potamogeton natans in Flora of North America
 USDA PLANTS Profile

natans
Freshwater plants
Flora of North America
Flora of Asia
Flora of Europe
Plants described in 1753
Taxa named by Carl Linnaeus